Tania Detomas (born 10 August 1985) is an Italian snowboarder. She was born in Cavalese. She competed at the 2006 Winter Olympics, in halfpipe.

References

External links 
 

1985 births
Living people
People from Cavalese
Italian female snowboarders
Olympic snowboarders of Italy
Snowboarders at the 2006 Winter Olympics
Sportspeople from Trentino
21st-century Italian women